The Drayton Case is a 1953 British short crime film produced by the Anglo-Amalgamated production company as part of their Scotland Yard film series. It was directed by Ken Hughes and is hosted by Edgar Lustgarten. It stars Hilda Barry and John Le Mesurier.

Made at Merton Park Studios, it was originally released as support for cinema feature film screenings and later screened on television.

It is based on the case of Harry Dobkin with names and some other details changed.

Plot
During the early years of World War II, a bomb from a German aeroplane uncovers the corpse of a strangled woman. It turns out she was killed by her husband Charles Drayton.

Cast
Vincent Platt as Drayton
Hilda Barry as Elizabeth Drayton
John Le Mesurier as Div. Spt. Henley
Victor Ball as Henley's assistant

References

External links

The Drayton Case at BFI

1953 films
British short films
1953 crime films
British crime films
Films directed by Ken Hughes
1953 short films
British black-and-white films
1950s English-language films
1950s British films